Crime & Investigation (stylized as Crime + Investigation) is a pan-European television channel based in the United Kingdom, owned by A&E Networks UK (a joint venture of A&E Networks and Sky Group). The channel primarily broadcasts true crime programming, and is a European version of the U.S. network of the same name.

TVT Media is responsible for the signal distribution across mainland Europe, and local subsidiaries of A&E Networks are the distribution representatives across Europe, except for Spain and Portugal. In Spain, it is named Crimen + Investigación and in Portugal, it is named Crime + Investigation and it is operated by AMC Networks International Southern Europe. The Portuguese version also airs in Portuguese-speaking African countries (Angola, Cape Verde, Equatorial Guinea, Guinea-Bissau, Mozambique and São Tomé and Príncipe).

Its programming is mainly in English and locally subtitled or dubbed. It is available through numerous satellite, cable, terrestrial and IPTV distributors across Europe, the Middle East and Africa.

History
A high definition version launched on Sky in the UK and Ireland on 5 November 2008. Crime+Investigation HD originally operated on a separate schedule to the standard definition channel and timeshared with Bio. HD. On 3 July 2012, Bio. HD closed to allow Crime + Investigation HD to broadcast 24 hours a day, simulcasting the standard definition channel.

A one-hour timeshift channel named CI +1 launched on Sky UK on 2 March 2009. Since the rebranding in January 2017, this has been named Crime+Investigation +1 and is on Sky channel 256.

The channel launched in the Netherlands in July 2011. Followed by Romania through UPC Romania on 2 September 2013 and Italy through Sky Italia on 17 December 2013.

The network launched on BT TV on 15 August 2013 and TalkTalk in the UK on 28 August 2014. It is on the Entertainment Extra Boost along with History.

The HD channel launched on Virgin Media channel 222 in the UK on 21 July 2018. At the same time, the timeshift channel also launched on there on channel 224.

On 6 November 2018, the European Commission ordered A&E Networks UK to divest its factual channels, as a condition of Disney's acquisition of 21st Century Fox.

It was announced on 1 October 2019 that the channel, along with Sister channels, History and Lifetime would no longer be packaged by MultiChoice's DStv across Africa by the end of October, 2019 after its carriage contract broke down between the A+E Networks and MultiChoice. but since they reached carriage agreement with Multichoice and A+E Networks, History and Lifetime are kept, but Crime+Investigation was dropped from the platform.

References

External links

A&E Networks
Television channels in the Netherlands
Television channels in the United Kingdom
Television channels in North Macedonia
Television channels and stations established in 2006
Sky television channels
AMC Networks International
2006 establishments in the United Kingdom
Television stations in Spain
Television stations in Portugal
Crime television networks
Joint ventures